Club Quarters Hotels are full-service hotels designed for business travelers with locations in the U.S. and U.K. Club Quarters was founded by American business executive Ralph Bahna, who opened the first Club Quarters Hotel on West 45th Street in Midtown Manhattan in 1994. Headquartered in Stamford, CT, Club Quarters Hotels has locations in New York City, London, Chicago, Boston, Pittsburgh, Philadelphia, Washington, D.C., Houston and San Francisco.

Founder Ralph Bahna sought to open his hotels near major corporate and financial centers. He designed the chain's business model to give priority to business travelers whose companies and organizations joined Club Quarters Hotels as members. In a 2012 interview with the Haas School of Business at the University of California, Berkeley, Bahna stated that his goal for his hotels was "to have the best locations, be full service, charge less, and still make a big profit."

References

External links

Companies based in Stamford, Connecticut
Hotel chains in the United States